Madras War Cemetery is located in Nandambakkam, Chennai (formerly Madras), Tamil Nadu, India. It was created to receive Second World War graves from civil and cantonment cemeteries in the south and east of India where their permanent maintenance could not be assured.

Description
The cemetery is open to the public.

The cemetery occupies  and contains the graves of 856 Commonwealth service people who died in the Second World War. It was established in 1952 by the Imperial War Graves Commission, which is now known as the Commonwealth War Graves Commission (CWGC), to pay tribute to the people of the Commonwealth nations who died in military service. The cemetery is maintained by the CWGC in partnership with Government of India. The cemetery is given to the CWGC under perpetual lease by the Defence Ministry.

The cemetery also includes Madras 1914–1918 War Memorial, which is situated at the rear of the site and is styled on the lines of a lawn cemetery. The memorial, which does not contain any bodies, bears plaques with the names of British and Commonwealth soldiers who died in both World Wars and the inscription; "Their name liveth for evermore". It bears the names of more than 1,039 servicemen who died during the First World War and whose remains lie in many civil and cantonment cemeteries across India, where it is not possible to maintain their graves in perpetuity. Commonwealth nationals whose remains were buried include 14 Australians and 5 New Zealanders.

See also

 Victory War Memorial
 Delhi War Cemetery

References

External links

 
 Chennaibest.com – Monuments in Chennai – Madras War Cemetery
 
 

Cemeteries in India
Monuments and memorials in Chennai
1952 establishments in Madras State
Commonwealth War Graves Commission cemeteries in India